David Goldar Gómez (born 15 September 1994) is a Spanish professional footballer who plays as a central defender for Burgos CF.

Club career
Born in Portas, Galicia, Goldar played youth football with local RC Celta de Vigo. He started his senior career in 2013 with the B team in the Segunda División B, being initially deployed as a defensive midfielder. 

Goldar made his La Liga debut on 3 May 2014, coming on as a 76th-minute substitute for Andreu Fontàs in a 2–0 away win against CA Osasuna. In June 2016 he was released from his contract, and on 14 September he signed for third-division club SD Ponferradina.

Goldar continued in division three in the 2017–18 season, with Pontevedra CF. On 9 July 2018, he joined UE Cornellà of the same league, being a regular starter during the campaign and scoring four goals.

On 2 July 2019, Goldar agreed to a two-year contract with Gimnàstic de Tarragona, recently relegated to the third tier. In the summer of 2020, he moved to UD Ibiza. He helped the latter side to reach the Segunda División for the first time ever in his first year, contributing four goals to this feat.

In 2021–22, which was also his first season at that level, Goldar helped Ibiza to stay up with seven goals from 36 games which were the best figures for a defender in nine years; most were headed in from corner kicks. On 26 January 2023, however, he terminated his contract with the club, and joined Burgos CF later that day.

Personal life
In June 2021, Goldar was called as a witness for the trial of his former Celta teammate Santi Mina, who was accused of sexual assault on their holiday in Mojácar four years earlier. The following March, he was tried as the latter's alleged accomplice, being acquitted as Mina was sent to prison for four years.

References

External links

1994 births
Living people
People from Caldas (comarca)
Sportspeople from the Province of Pontevedra
Spanish footballers
Footballers from Galicia (Spain)
Association football defenders
La Liga players
Segunda División players
Segunda División B players
Celta de Vigo B players
RC Celta de Vigo players
SD Ponferradina players
Pontevedra CF footballers
UE Cornellà players
Gimnàstic de Tarragona footballers
UD Ibiza players
Burgos CF footballers
People acquitted of crimes